John Bryant "Sam" Gannon  (8 February 1947 – 5 February 2021) was an Australian cricketer who played in three Test matches during the 1977/78 season.

Career
Gannon made his first-class debut for Western Australia in 1966–67, taking three wickets against Victoria and 6/107 against South Australia.

He played in the Shield-winning WA sides of 1967–68 and took seven wickets against the touring Indian side.

In 1970–71 he took 4/41 against the touring English side.

In 1971–72 he took 5/97 against Victoria. WA won the Shield that year.

From November 1972 he did not play for WA for five years.

World Series Cricket and Test Selection
When World Series Cricket happened he was recalled to the West Australian side. and had a strong season. He took four wickets against NSW and 4/70 against India.

He was called into the Australian side for the second Test against India replacing an injured Alan Hurst.

He took 3/84 and 4/77 (including a spell of 4/13), helping Australia win by two wickets. This effort meant Gannon kept his place for the next two Tests.

He took only four wickets over the next two Tests, both of which Australia dropped. Gannon was dropped for the 5th Test against India and subsequent tour of West Indies in favour of Ian Callen. According to one report, "Gannon captured 11 wickets at 32.82 in his three Tests, but most of his victims were tailenders, and the top order Indian batsmen seldom experienced difficulty against him.."

At the beginning of the 1978–79 season, selector Neil Harvey said Gannon was a prospect for Test selection. However he was not picked and the season turned out to be his last.

Post playing career
Following his retirement from cricket, Gannon became a highly successful businessman.

Gannon was elected chairman of the Western Australian Cricket Association in August 2013.

Gannon was awarded the Medal of the Order of Australia (OAM) in the 2017 Queen's Birthday Honours for service to cricket.

He died three days before his 74th birthday.

References

External links

1947 births
Australia Test cricketers
Western Australia cricketers
Australian cricketers
Cricketers from Perth, Western Australia
Sportsmen from Western Australia
Recipients of the Medal of the Order of Australia
2021 deaths